The Halo Benders was a band formed in 1994 as a side project by Calvin Johnson of Beat Happening and Doug Martsch of Built to Spill. They released their first album, God Don't Make No Junk, in 1994. They followed up in 1996 with Don't Tell Me Now and in 1998 with The Rebels Not In.

Following a hiatus through the early 2000s, the Halo Benders reformed in March 2007 for a pair of shows at the Visual Arts Collective in Boise, Idaho. The band featured Doug Martsch, Ralf Youtz, Calvin Johnson, Brett Netson, and Stephen Gere. November 2010, a reformed version with both Doug and Calvin appeared for a benefit for Friends of Mia, related to Mia Zapata the late singer for The Gits at the Capitol Theater in Olympia, WA.

All three of the band's albums were released on Johnson's Olympia record label, K Records.

Music
The Halo Benders' music is characterized by untraditional sounds, movements, and song structures.  The vocals of the baritone Johnson and the higher-pitched Martsch have been described as highly contrasting - "each seems to inhabit a completely different song." Johnson has said that the two write lyrics for songs largely independently.

Featured on Real Stories of the Highway Patrol
While the band was touring Utah in the 90's, they were pulled over by police officers filming for the reality series Real Stories of the Highway Patrol.

Members
Doug Martsch - guitar, vocals, bass, keyboards, percussion
Ralf Youtz - drums, guitar
Calvin Johnson - vocals, guitar, samples
Wayne Flower - bass, drums
Steve Fisk - keyboards
Heather Dunn - studio musician, guitars on The Rebels Not In

Discography

Studio albums
God Don't Make No Junk (1994, K Records)
Don't Tell Me Now (1996, K Records)
The Rebels Not In (1998, K Records)

Singles & EPs
Canned Oxygen 7" (1994, Atlas Records)
Don't Touch My Bikini (1995, Fire Records)

References

Rock music groups from Washington (state)
K Records artists
Musical groups from Olympia, Washington
Musical groups established in 1994
1994 establishments in Washington (state)